Francis Barnard may refer to:

 Francis Stillman Barnard (1856–1936), Canadian parliamentarian and Lieutenant Governor of British Columbia
 Francis Barnard (Australian cricketer) (1857–1932), Australian cricketer
 Francis Barnard (English cricketer) (1902–1996), English cricketer
 Francis Jones Barnard (1829–1889), British Columbia businessman and Member of Parliament